The Inception Score (IS) is an algorithm used to assess the quality of images created by a generative image model such as a generative adversarial network (GAN). The score is calculated based on the output of a separate, pretrained Inceptionv3 image classification model applied to a sample of (typically around 30,000) images generated by the generative model. The Inception Score is maximized when the following conditions are true:

 The entropy of the distribution of labels predicted by the Inceptionv3 model for the generated images is minimized. In other words, the classification model confidently predicts a single label for each image. Intuitively, this corresponds to the desideratum of generated images being "sharp" or "distinct".
 The predictions of the classification model are evenly distributed across all possible labels. This corresponds to the desideratum that the output of the generative model is "diverse".

It has been somewhat superseded by the related Fréchet inception distance. While the Inception Score only evaluates the distribution of generated images, the FID compares the distribution of generated images with the distribution of a set of real images ("ground truth").

Definition 
Let there be two spaces, the space of images  and the space of labels . The space of labels is finite.

Let  be a probability distribution over  that we wish to judge.

For any image , and any label , let  be the probability that image  has label , according to the discriminator. It is usually implemented as an Inception-v3 network trained on ImageNet.

The Inception Score of  relative to  isEquivalent rewrites include is nonnegative by Jensen's inequality.

Pseudocode:

Interpretation 
A higher inception score is interpreted as "better", as it means that  is a "sharp and distinct" collection of pictures.

, where  is the total number of possible labels.

 iff for almost all That means  is completely "indistinct".

The highest inception score  is achieved if and only if the two conditions are both true:
 For almost all , the distribution  is concentrated on one label. That is, .
That is, the generated images are equally distributed over all labels.

References 

Machine learning
Computer graphics